Cyligramma is a genus of moths of the family Noctuidae.

Species
Cyligramma amblyops Mabille, 1891
Cyligramma conradsi Berio, 1954
Cyligramma disturbans (Walker, 1858)
Cyligramma duplex Guenée, 1852
Cyligramma fluctuosa (Drury, 1773)
Cyligramma griseata Gaede, 1936
Cyligramma joa Boisduval, 1833
Cyligramma latona (Cramer, 1775)
Cyligramma limacina (Guerin-Meneville, 1832)
Cyligramma magus (Guerin-Meneville, 1844)
Cyligramma simplex Gruenberg, 1910

References
Natural History Museum Lepidoptera genus database

Catocalinae